Fluy is a commune in the Somme department in Hauts-de-France in northern France.

Geography

History
The name is recorded in 1066 under the name Floy, in 1638 as Flenuy and in 1657 as the variant Fleuny .

Population

In 1698, the population was 500.

Places of interest
The church of Saint Marie-Madeleine

See also
Communes of the Somme department

References

External links

 Official Fluy website 

Communes of Somme (department)